Sir John Swinburne, 6th Baronet (6 March 1762 – 26 September 1860) was an English politician and patron of the arts.

Life
He was born at Bordeaux. The Swinburne family of Capheaton Hall was traditionally Roman Catholic and Jacobite, but at age 25 Swinburne inherited the baronetcy and went into politics as a Protestant Whig. He became Member of Parliament for Launceston in 1788. There was a vacancy there, because the sitting MP George Rose had accepted an office under the Crown, and had to step down; Swinburne from 1786 had intended to stand for Northumberland, but Hugh Percy, 2nd Duke of Northumberland managed his selection for the Cornwall constituency.  He went no further in Parliament, but remained a political leader in Northumberland, and an associate of Charles Grey who was elected for the constituency in 1786.

Swinburne completed the work on the north front of Capheaton Hall envisaged by his father. It was carried out by William Newton.

He was a Fellow of the Royal Society, Fellow of the Society of Antiquaries of London, and the first president of the Society of Antiquaries of Newcastle upon Tyne.

Patron
He was a patron to William Mulready: they shared an enthusiasm for boxing. Mulready taught 
the Swinburne family and painted their portraits. He also supported John Hodgson, who referred in his History of Northumberland to Swinburne as a "munificent contributor to the embellishments and materials of this work".

Family
He married Emma, daughter of Richard Henry Alexander Bennet of Babraham, Cambridgeshire, on 13 July 1787; she was a niece of Frances Julia (née Burrell, daughter of Peter Burrell), second wife of the 2nd Duke of Northumberland. Their children were:

Edward (1788–1819), who married Anne Nassau Sutton;
Charles Henry (1797–1877), Royal Navy officer; he married Jane Henrietta, daughter of George Ashburnham, 3rd Earl of Ashburnham, and they had six children, of whom the second was the poet Algernon Charles Swinburne.
Elizabeth (1790–1790);
Julia (1795–);
Emily Elizabeth (1798– ), who married Henry George Ward in 1824;
Frances (1799–1821);
Elizabeth (1805–1896), married John William Bowden in 1828.

He died, aged 98, in December 1860.

Arms

Notes

External links
Royal Academy of Arts page

1762 births
1860 deaths
People from Bordeaux
Members of the Parliament of Great Britain for English constituencies
British MPs 1784–1790
Baronets in the Baronetage of England
Fellows of the Royal Society
Fellows of the Society of Antiquaries of London